Polo & Pan are a French music duo consisting of Paul Armand-Delille (aka Polocorp or Polo) and Alexandre Grynszpan (aka Peter Pan or Pan). 

Their music style incorporates a mixture of house-electronic music influenced by tropical sounds and music from all over the world. The duo has released two studio albums and a number of successful EPs. 

The 2021 single "Ani Kuni" is their biggest chart song.

History
The two were known individually due to their performances in the Parisian bar  'Le Baron'   where they met in 2012. They intiially started out together by mixing existing songs before launching their own careers with original music. 

A lot of their early work is found in their debut EP 'Rivolta' and the follow-up EP 'Dorothy', both of which were released on the Hamburger Records/Ekler'O'Shock labels. Their third EP release 'Canopée' in 2016 resulted in their first charting song, the same-titled 'Canopée' produced by Raphaël Hamburger of Hamburger Records and Matthieu Gazier of Ekler'O'shock.

In 2017, they collaborated with musician Jacques Auberger, known by the mononym Jacques, resulting in the single 'Jacquadi'. This lead to the release of their debut studio album 'Caravelle' which was released on 19 May 2017, with the track 'Cœur Croisé' released as a single with an accompanying music video. The album was a critical success with Julien Baldacchino of France Inter and by the site Les Inrocks, amongst many. In July 2018, a deluxe edition of the same album was released and in October the same year the EP 'Mexicali' and a tour to promote the album and EP from September to December 2018. The album was certified gold in 2018, alongside a gold certified single 'Nanã'. The follow-up EP 'Gengis' was made up of remixed tracks rather than original compositions. In 2020, the single 'Feel Good' was released followed by a same-titled EP.

June 2021 saw their biggest success, the album 'Cyclorama' carrying the single 'Ani Kuni' based on a traditional song 'Ani Couni Chaouani', a Native American hymn originating from the Arapaho tribes living on the plains of Colorado and Wyoming in the United States. 'Ani Kuni' became Polo & Pan's biggest hit rising to number 10 on the French SNEP Singles Chart, also charting in Belgium's Ultratop Wallonia chart.

Discography

Studio albums 

Others
Caravelle (Deluxe) (Hamburger Records / Ekler'O'Shock, 2018)

EPs 
Rivolta (Hamburger Records, 2013)
Dorothy (Hamburger Records / Ekler'O'Shock, 2014)
Plage isolée (Hamburger Records / Ekler'O'Shock, 2015)
Canopée (Hamburger Records / EOS Records, 2016)
Mexicali (Remixes)(Hamburger Records / Ekler'O'Shock, 2018)
Gengis (Hamburger Records / EOS Records, 2019)
Feel Good (Hamburger Records / EOS Records, 2020)

Singles 

Other releases
2013: "Rivolta"
2014: "Dorothy"
2015: "Plage isolée"
2016: "Nanã"
2016: "Bakara"
2017: "Jacquadi"
2017: "Cœur croisé"
2017: "Zoom Zoom"
2017: "Mexicali"
2017: "Aqualand"
2018: "Arc-en-ciel"
2019: "Gengis"
2020: "Feel Good"
2021: "Tunnel"
2021: "Les jolies choses"

References

External links
Official website

French musical duos
Musical groups from Paris